Calocybe gambosa, commonly known as St. George's mushroom, is an edible mushroom that grows mainly in fields, grass verges and roadsides. Deriving its common name from when it first appears in the UK, namely on St George's Day (23 April). It appears in March in Italy, a warmer country where it is also a popular mushroom to eat, and is known there as prugnolo. It is also popular in Northern Spain and Southern France, in the Basque Country region and its surroundings where it appears in April. In these regions it is usually eaten sautéed with egg or with bacon.

It is considered a delicacy, especially when fried in butter. It was previously considered a part of the large genus Tricholoma and is still seen as T. gambosum in older texts.

Taxonomy
Initially described as Agaricus gambosus by Elias Magnus Fries in his 1821 work Systema Mycologicum, with its specific epithet derived from a Latin term for "club footed" in relation to its bulky stipe. It was later named Tricholoma gambosum by Paul Kummer in 1871, before being reclassified as Calocybe gambosa by Marinus Anton Donk in 1962. In Germany it is known as Maipilz, where it fruits in May. The genus name is derived from the Ancient Greek terms kalos "pretty", and cubos "head". In Denmark it is called Vårmousseron, appearing in spring—early May

Description
The cap measures from 5–15 cm (2 to 6 inches) in diameter and has a smooth texture and has ridges on it. The colour of the cap, stipe and flesh can range from white-creamy coloured to bright yellow. The sinuate gills are white and crowded. The flesh is thick and soft and has a mealy or cucumber smell. The spore print is white to pinkish white. The stubby stipe is bulky at the base.

Care must be taken not to confuse it with the highly poisonous Inosperma erubescens, which grows in the same habitats. The latter has a more pungent fruity smell and bruises red. Entoloma sinuatum, also poisonous, has a rancid smell.

Distribution and habitat
Calocybe gambosa is common in grasslands in Europe, often in areas rich in limestone. It is common on the Swedish islands Öland and Gotland, both situated in the Baltic sea. On the South Downs in southern England, it has formed huge fairy rings that appear to be several hundred years old. It is found from April in the United Kingdom, and earlier in warmer countries.

Edibility
The mushroom is best picked in dry weather. It can be eaten dry, pickled or even raw. It is imported in commercial quantities into Western Europe from Romania. It was held in high esteem in medieval Italy, reported by Costanzo Felici in 1569 as the most expensive and highly regarded mushroom in Umbria
and Marches in central Italy, and held in high esteem in the Apennine mountain region—Liguria, Tuscany, and Emilia-Romagna)—by Giovanni Targioni Tozzetti in 1777. It is still locally eaten in Emilia-Romagna and Tuscany.

St George's mushroom is highly prized in the Basque Country of Spain, where it fetches very high prices. In Alava, it is traditionally eaten on the feast of Saint Prudence (28 April), alongside snails. The mushroom is also a cornerstone of the gastronomy of Bilbao, where it is typically eaten in an omelette. The demand in the Basque Country is so high the mushroom has to be imported from Eastern Europe.

Some people have been reported to react to an unknown allergen in this mushroom. Because of this, it is wise to only eat a small portion the first time you try this mushroom. It is uncertain whether cooking the mushroom for a longer time period reduces reactions to it, but it might help so until there is further research done; it is advisable to cook this mushroom for 10 – 15 minutes before eating.

Calocybe gambosa grows at the same time of year and locations to, and can be confused with, young Inocybe erubescens (poisonous), Melanoleuca strictipes (inedible), and Entoloma sinuatum (poisonous).

References

External links

Lyophyllaceae
Fungi described in 1821
Fungi of Europe
Edible fungi
Fungi found in fairy rings
Taxa named by Elias Magnus Fries